The Sanghar are a partly Hindu and partly Muslim community found in the state of Gujarat in India.

History and origin

According their traditions, the community are a branch of the Manka community which are coming from the  Chavda, Rajputs tribe. According to their tradition, the community was nomadic until they came to an agreement with the rulers of Kutch to settle down. The local word in the Kutchi language for agreement is sangh, and their initial settlement was at Gandhavi, near Porbandar. They are now found mainly in Mandvi taluka of Kutch, where they are found in twelve villages, namely Vandh, Bidada, Pipri, Ratodia, Bhojay, Undot, Khojachora, Asani and Serdi, all along the coast. In addition to these settlements, they are also found in the village of Mota Jakh in Nakhatrana Taluka as well as in Abdasa Taluka. In Pakistan they are mainly found in Ghotki city and its surroundings, in Ghotki city Sardar khan sanghar house and sanghar house 2 ( Prof. Naseer Ahmed sanghar house ) are the major landmarks for this community. Other major villages are Khan Goth, Goth Peeral Sanghar, Goth Allah-Warayo sanghar, Goth Jumo sanghar, Goth Jhando sanghar, Goth murad sanghar, Goth salim shah Bukhari, Basti Bari shareef (Rahim Yar khan, punjab province) and Rahim yar khan city.

Present circumstances

The Sanghar are divided along religious line, with majority being Vishnuvi Hindu, and a minority are Sunni Muslim in india and in Pakistan majority being Sunni Muslim and minority Shia Muslims.  In Pakistan they are community of mixed farmers, government officers and educators, OGDCL pakistan (Qadir Pur plant) is major source of income for the people live in Ghotki. In India they are a community of farmers, with a minority involved in cattle rearing. Many also serve in the Border Security Force, as their settlements are close to the Pakistan border. In Pakistan the majority of the Sanghar community is settled in Province of Sindh though they are residing in different part of Sindh whereas the majority is settled in Ghotki, Sukkur, Khairpur, Karachi. Mostly in District Karachi (South), (West), (Malir) but majority of population residing in Karachi District (South). Here in Karachi and rest part of Pakistan the community is Muslim and the headquarters of Sanghaar Community is in Ghotki where tribal leader Sardar khan sanghar lives. Sardar Gull Bahar khan house holds the power of the tribe. Some of the sanghar people live in punjab province of Pakistan, Rahim Yar khan and its surroundings have huge population of sanghar caste where people speak sindhi and saraiki both. wheres the branches is situated in Nawabad Branch (Khadda Market) as well as in District Malir and Mochco (Mowach Goth) District West. 
The Sanghaar community belongs to the Kutchi community whereas the lot of communities are the part of Kutch (Gujrat State) India,

Sanghar in Pakistan are following sardar system, current sardar of the tribe is Sardar Khan sanghar the second.

See also
Manka

References

Social groups of Gujarat
Tribes of Kutch
Maldhari communities
Muslim communities of India
Sindhi tribes
Sindhi tribes in India
Muslim communities of Gujarat